Herbert Fisher (c. 1922 – April 3, 1993) was an American businessman and the founder of discount retailer Jamesway.

Biography
Fisher was born to a Jewish family  in New York City and raised in Borough Park, Brooklyn. He is a graduate of Townsend Harris High School and attended City College for two years before serving in the Army Air Force during World War II. After the war, he worked as a merchandise packer at $12 a week. In 1960, he opened the first Jamesway stores in Jamestown, New York hence the name Jamesway. Jamesway was a discount retailer which focused on high volumes at low prices. In 1967, he took the company public. He grew the business to 108 stores and 5,000 employees mainly in New York, New Jersey, and Pennsylvania. In 1977, he retired from his position as CEO and president but remained as chairman until his death.

He served on the board of governors of the Hackensack Hospital, was national vice president of the Muscular Dystrophy Association, and was elected to the Discounting Hall of Fame.

Personal life
In 1950, he married Florence Temkin; they had three daughters, Meredith Fisher Gitler, Judith Fisher Furer, and Lesley Fisher Greenblatt.  Fisher died of colon cancer at his home in Oradell, New Jersey. His wife died in 2015.

References

1920s births
1993 deaths
20th-century American Jews
People from Brooklyn
American company founders
American retail chief executives
United States Army Air Forces personnel of World War II